Donald Lamont, professionally known by his stage name Donald D, is an American rapper and record producer from the Bronx, New York. He is a member of the Universal Zulu Nation, a former member of the B-Boys, and is best known as a member of Ice-T's Rhyme Syndicate.

Career

Late 1970s–1987: Universal Zulu Nation and the B-Boys 
Donald D began his career in 1978 in the Bronx, New York, when he became a member of the Universal Zulu Nation joining forces with Afrika Islam, DJ Jazzy Jay, Kid Vicious and others as the group the Funk Machine. He was featured on Afrika Islam's radio show the Zulu Beats on WHBI in 1982. Lamont and DJ Chuck Chillout formed a group named the B-Boys. From 1983 to 1985, the group has released several 12" singles via Vincent Davis' Vintertainment and Morgan Khan's Streetwave labels, including a 12-inch extended play Cuttin' Herbie, which peaked at #90 on the UK Albums Chart. When the group disbanded, Donald D released a single "Dope Jam / Outlaw" with DJ Chilly-D via Rockin' Hard Records in 1987.

1988–1992: Rhyme Syndicate 
In 1985, Lamont met West Coast rapper Tracy 'Ice-T' Marrow and later went to Los Angeles, California to join the Rhyme Syndicate. His first appearances were in 1988 on the track "The Syndicate" with Hen Gee from Ice-T's album Power, and on the track "Name of the Game" from Rhyme Syndicate compilation album Comin' Through. Donald-D was featured on the posse-cut single "What Ya Wanna Do" and released his debut studio album titled Notorious in 1989. Reaching a peak position of number 78 on the Billboard Top R&B/Hip-Hop Albums, the album remained on the US chart for a total of 18 weeks, spawning a single "F.B.I. (Free Base Institute)", which also peaked at number 8 on the Billboard Hot Rap Songs. A year after, he made his guest appearance on his bandmate Everlast's debut album Forever Everlasting on the track "The Rhythm" with N'Dea Davenport and Ice-T. Lamont also appeared on two tracks from O.G. Original Gangster and provided audio production on Home Invasion. In 1992, Donald D released his sophomore studio effort titled Let the Horns Blow on Sire/Warner Bros. Records. The song "I'm Gonna Smoke Him" off the album was featured in Trespass (soundtrack).

1993–present 
In 1995, Donald D, Kurtis Blow and Prince Whipper Whip were featured on the track "Old School Jam" from DJ Honda's self-titled album.

In 2003, he released a single "Hip Hop / The Return of the Culture", that was later included in his debut solo extended play B.R.O.N.X. (Beats Rhymes of New Xperience), released in 2006 under Dondee alias. In the same year (2003), he's featured duetting with Marco Masini in the song Generation, in which he sings in English the final rap part (personally significant is the line «as a boy growing up / in the South South Bronx»).

He has started a new group with another Universal Zulu Nation Rhyme Syndicate member, DJ MC Dynamax, called the Bronx Syndicate.

Discography

Solo albums

Extended plays
 2006 — B.R.O.N.X. (Beats Rhymes of New Xperience)

Singles

Guest appearances

References

External links 

Living people
American rappers
Sire Records artists
Epic Records artists
21st-century American rappers
Year of birth missing (living people)